This article is regarding records and statistics of the South Korea national football team.

Player records

Other records 
 Youngest player 17 years and 241 days, Kim Pan-keun, vs. Thailand, 1 November 1983
 Youngest goalscorer 18 years and 87 days, Ko Jong-soo, vs. New Zealand, 25 January 1997
 Oldest player 39 years and 274 days, Kim Yong-sik, vs. Hong Kong, 15 April 1950
 Oldest goalscorer 39 years and 274 days, Kim Yong-sik, vs. Hong Kong, 15 April 1950
 Longest career 19 years and 112 days, Lee Dong-gook, from 16 May 1998 to 5 September 2017
 Most goals in a calendar year 16, Park Lee-chun (1972) and Hwang Sun-hong (1994)
 Most consecutive matches scored in 6, Ha Seok-ju (1993)
 Fastest goal from kick-off 16 seconds, Hwang Hee-chan, vs. Qatar, 17 November 2020
 Most hat-tricks 3, Cha Bum-kun and Park Sung-hwa

Manager records

Team records

 Biggest victory 16–0 vs. Nepal, 29 September 2003 (2004 AFC Asian Cup qualification)
 Highest scoring draw 4–4 vs. Malaysia, 11 September 1976 (1976 Korea Cup)
 Heaviest defeat 0–12 vs. Sweden, 5 August 1948 (1948 Summer Olympics)
 Most consecutive victories 11, from 29 July 1975 (3–1 vs. Malaysia) to 21 December 1975 (3–1 vs. Burma)
 Most consecutive matches without defeat 29, from 20 September 1986 (3–0 vs. India) to 26 June 1989 (0–0 vs. Czechoslovakia)

Head-to-head record

See also 
 South Korea national football team
 South Korea national football team results
 Korea Football Association

References

External links
Korea Football Association official website 

South Korea national football team records and statistics
Football records and statistics in South Korea
Korea